Dariya Yaroslavivna Zgoba ( born 7 November 1989) is a retired Ukrainian Artistic gymnast. She was the 2007 European Champion on the uneven bars, and she represented Ukraine at the 2008 Summer Olympics. Her best event was the uneven bars.

Personal life 
Zgoba married Oleg Zaiats in 2012. She has an older sister named Katya.

Career

2005 
At the World Cup in Paris, Zgoba finished third on the uneven bars with a score of 9.375. She finished sixth in the beam final with an 8.550  
Zgoba competed at the 2005 European Championships. She finished ninth in the all-around with a score of 35.274, and she won bronze on the uneven bars with a score of 9.500. 
At the 2005 World Championships, Zgoba scored 8.600 on bars and 8.100 on beam in the qualification round. These scores didn't qualify her into any event final.

2006 
Zgoba competed at the World Cups in Moscow, Glasgow, and Stuttgart. In Moscow, she finished second on the uneven bars with 15.200 and fourth on beam with 14.850. In Glasgow, she won silver medals on bars and beam. In Stuttgart, she won a bronze on beam and finished eighth on bars.

At the 2006 European Championships, Zgoba finished in fifth with her team, and she finished eighth in the uneven bar final with a score of 14.225.
At the 2006 World Championships, Zgoba was a part of the Ukrainian team that finished fifth. She finished 22nd in the all-around with a score of 56.925.
At the World Cup Final, Zgoba finished third on the uneven bars with a score of 15.150.

2007 
Zgoba competed at the World Cup in Paris where she won silver on bars and finished seventh on beam. At the World Cup in Ghent she won a silver on bars and a bronze on beam.
At the 2006 European Championships Zgoba finished eleventh in the all-around with a score of 56.025. She won the gold medal on bars with 15.775. 
At the World Cup in Shanghai she won silver on bars and bronze on beam. 
Zgoba competed at the 2007 Summer Universiade where she won a silver medal with her team and gold on the uneven bars.
At the 2007 World Championships, Zgoba was 30th in the all-around and 9th on the uneven bars during the qualification round, and she did not qualify for any event finals.

2008 
At the 2008 European Championships, Zgoba finished fifth with her team. She won a bronze on the uneven bars with a score of 15.625.

Beijing Olympics 
Zgoba represented Ukraine at the 2008 Summer Olympics. The team finished in eleventh in the qualification round, and Ukraine did not advance into the team final. Zgoba finished eighth in the uneven bars final with a score of 14.875.

After Beijing 
Zgoba competed at the 2009 Summer Universiade in Belgrade, Serbia, where she won bronze on the beam.

Zgoba retired from gymnastics in 2011.

Eponymous skill
Zgoba has one eponymous skill listed in the Code of Points.

See also
List of Olympic female gymnasts for Ukraine

References 

1989 births
Living people
Ukrainian female artistic gymnasts
Gymnasts at the 2008 Summer Olympics
Olympic gymnasts of Ukraine
Sportspeople from Ivano-Frankivsk
European champions in gymnastics
Universiade medalists in gymnastics
Universiade gold medalists for Ukraine
Universiade silver medalists for Ukraine
Universiade bronze medalists for Ukraine
Medalists at the 2009 Summer Universiade
Originators of elements in artistic gymnastics
21st-century Ukrainian women